Arun Gemini (born 1959) is an Indian writer, poet and satirist and TV personality from Haryana, India. He was awarded Kaka Hathrasi Award for outstanding contribution in the literary field by the Hindi Academy, Government of Delhi in 2000. Arun Gemini was honored with Haryana Gaurav Samman (Award) by the Haryana Sahitya Akadami, Government of Haryana in July 2014.

He hosted various TV shows including Doordarshan's Dharti Ka Aanchal, Zee TV's Darasal, DD Metro's Taal Betal and Zee India's Yahi Hai Politics. He has also appeared on Wah! Wah! Kya Baat Hai! and Sony TV's The Kapil Sharma Show.

Life and career 
He was born on 22 April 1959, in New Delhi, India. He is the son of the famous poet and humorist Gemini Haryanvi. He has done a master's degree in Hindi from Hansraj College of Delhi University from where Gemini graduated in 1980. He did his first poetry recital as a child poet in 1971.

Arun Gemini has published many published poetry collections including Filhaal Itna Hi Hai, Khoon Bolta Hai and Hasya Vyangya Ki Shikhar Kavitaaye. In September 2012, he was one of the participants of SAB TV's comic poetry series Wah! Wah! Kya Baat Hai!. He was featured in the holi special episode of The Kapil Sharma Show in March 2019.

Gemini has hosted 26 episodes of the TV show, Dharti Ka Aanchal aired on Doordarshan. He also hosted 26 episodes of Hansgola, a comedy-poetry show, aired from NEPC TV. Some other TV shows that he hosted as a poet include Zee TV's Darasal, DD Metro's Taal Betal and Zee India's Yahi Hai Politics.

Bibliography 
 "Filhaal Itna Hi Hai", 2006 
 "Khoon Bolta Hai"  
 "Hasya Vyangya Ki Shikhar Kavitaaye", 20212

Television

Awards and recognition 
  He was honored with Haryana Gaurav Samman by the Haryana Sahitya Akadami, Government of Haryana in July 2014.
 He was honored with Pandit Jhabarmal Sharma Literary Award by the Rajasthan Brahmin Association in 2017.
 Arun Gemini was awarded the Kaka Hathrasi Award by the Hindi Academy, Government of Delhi in 2000.
 He is the recipient of Omprakash Aditya Samman in 2000.
 He was honored by President of India, Dr. Shankar Dayal Sharma in 1996 and Prime Minister Atal Bihari Vajpayee in 2002.

References

External links  
 
 Arun Gemini's Poetry on Amar Ujala
  on KAVIGRAM

1959 births
Living people
Hindi-language writers
Hindi-language poets
People from New Delhi
Indian humorists
21st-century Indian poets
Indian male poets
21st-century Indian male writers